Carlyle is a city in Clinton County, Illinois, United States. The population was 3,253 at the 2020 census. It is the county seat of Clinton County.

History
In 1811 or 1812, a man named John Hill built one of several "block" houses along the Goshen Trail, located at what is currently 201 Fairfax Street. The houses were reportedly built to serve as a line of defense against Native Americans. John Hill built the first house to be located in what has become Carlyle. He also established what could be considered Carlyle's first business: a ferry to carry traffic across the Kaskaskia River, including a small shelter at the river which served as a toll house.

In 1816, Charles Slade and two of his brothers reached the John Hill settlement and bought him out. Charles farmed the land, took over the ferry, and within a year partnered with a man named Hubbard to start the first store, a mercantile business located at what is now 301 Fairfax Street. In 1818, a man named Calvin Barnes laid out town lots. On March 10, 1819, a post office was first established under the name Carlisle, Illinois. This spelling might have been a clerical error.

The area was settled after the 1809 creation of the Illinois Territory but before Illinois achieved statehood, six to seven years after John Hill had already built his establishment. Illinois' first state capitol was located in Kaskaskia, but in 1820 the state decided that it should be moved. Carlyle lost to Vandalia by one vote. In 1824, the State of Illinois created Clinton County by carving it out of Washington, Bond, and Fayette counties. Carlyle was to be the county seat should land be donated for this purpose. Charles Slade donated  of property so that the county seat would be located in Carlyle.

Carlyle was founded in 1818 by Charles W. Slade, father of Joseph "Jack" Slade, who named the town after his grandmother's family. It was incorporated as a town on 2/10/1837 and incorporated as a city on 4/17/1884.  Carlyle celebrated 150 years and used the 1837 date.

Charles Slade pushed hard for Carlyle to become the state capital of Illinois, but lost by one vote to Vandalia in 1819. In 1824, Clinton County was formed, and Carlyle became the county seat in July 1825, both at the initiative of Charles Slade.

Geography
Carlyle is located slightly east of the center of Clinton County at  (38.612642, -89.370789). The Kaskaskia River flows through the easternmost part of the city out of Carlyle Dam, located just northeast of the city limits and which impounds Carlyle Lake, the largest lake wholly in Illinois.

U.S. Route 50 passes through the city, leading east  to Salem and west  to St. Louis. Illinois Route 127 leads north  to Greenville and south  to Nashville, Illinois. The General Dean Suspension Bridge, built in 1859 and named after Major General William F. Dean in 1953, crosses the Kaskaskia River just north of the current US 50 bridge.

Demographics

As of the 2020 census there were 3,253 people, 1,442 households, and 1,041 families residing in the city. The racial makeup of the city was 88.56% White, 3.90% African American, 0.31% Native American, 0.89% Asian, 0.86% from other races, and 5.47% from two or more races. Hispanic or Latino of any race were 2.34% of the population.

There were 1,442 households, out of which 43.48% had children under the age of 18 living with them, 47.50% were married couples living together, 19.90% had a female householder with no husband present, and 27.81% were non-families. 24.48% of all households were made up of individuals, and 8.74% had someone living alone who was 65 years of age or older. The average household size was 2.71 and the average family size was 2.34.

The city's age distribution consisted of 17.7% under the age of 18, 18.3% from 18 to 24, 22.9% from 25 to 44, 25% from 45 to 64, and 16.1% who were 65 years of age or older. The median age was 36.1 years. For every 100 females, there were 98.1 males. For every 100 females age 18 and over, there were 91.1 males.

The median income for a household in the city was $54,750, and the median income for a family was $67,188. Males had a median income of $28,125 versus $29,296 for females. The per capita income for the city was $27,101. About 10.9% of families and 11.4% of the population were below the poverty line, including 10.1% of those under age 18 and 30.7% of those age 65 or over.

Notable people 

 Herman J. C. Beckemeyer, Illinois state legislator, lawyer, and mayor of Carlyle
 Sidney Breese, circuit court judge, US senator, Illinois Supreme Court justice, Speaker of the Illinois House of Representatives
 William F. Dean, major general, Medal of Honor recipient
 Elias Smith Dennis, Union Army general in the Civil War
 James Donnewald, state treasurer
 Pat Jarvis, pitcher for the Atlanta Braves and Montreal Expos
 Patsy McGaffigan, infielder for the Philadelphia Phillies
 Edwin P. Ramsey, United States Army officer
 Mel Simons, outfielder for the Chicago White Sox
 Charles Slade, US marshal, congressman
 Jack Slade, American frontier figure, gunslinger
 William A. J. Sparks, US congressman

Notes

References

External links

 
 U.S. Army Corps of Engineers: Carlyle Lake

1818 establishments in Illinois Territory
Cities in Clinton County, Illinois
Cities in Illinois
County seats in Illinois
Populated places established in 1818